A thienotriazolodiazepine is a heterocyclic compound containing a diazepine ring fused to thiophene and triazole rings. Thienotriazolodiazepine forms the central core of several pharmaceutical drugs including:
 Brotizolam
 Ciclotizolam
 Deschloroetizolam
 Etizolam
 Fluclotizolam
 Metizolam

Thienotriazolodiazepines interact with the benzodiazepine receptor site, they typically have similar effects as 1,4-benzodiazepines (such as diazepam) and triazolobenzodiazepines (such as alprazolam).

Thienotriazolodiazepines that are not GABAA receptor positive allosteric modulators include:
Israpafant
JQ1

References